Parviturbo rolani is a species of sea snail, a marine gastropod mollusk in the family Skeneidae.

Description
The size of the shell attains 1.9 mm.

Distribution
This species occurs in the Atlantic Ocean off the Canary Islands at depths between 40 m and 45 m.

References

  Engl, K W , Parviturbo rolani n.sp.(Gastropoda: Skeneidae) from the Canary Islands; Novapex 2 p.141–143

External links

rolani
Gastropods described in 2001